John Walter Gast (born February 16, 1989) is an American former professional baseball pitcher who played in Major League Baseball (MLB) for the St. Louis Cardinals in 2013.

High school and college career 
Gast attended Lake Brantley High School in Altamonte Springs, Florida where he was a pitching standout. As a senior in 2007 he earned Seminole County "Player of the Year" honors after he struck out 85 batters in 57.2 innings with an ERA of 1.18. He also played on the U.S. Junior National Team.  Gast was drafted in the 5th round of the 2007 Major League Baseball draft by the Texas Rangers, but chose to attend Florida State University instead and play college baseball for the Seminoles. Gast suffered an elbow injury during the spring of his senior year in high school, which required Tommy John surgery on May 1, 2007  and forced him to be inactive during most of his first year with the Florida State team. In 2009 Gast played for the Harwich Mariners of the Cape Cod League.

Professional career 
The St. Louis Cardinals selected Gast in the sixth round of the 2010 Major League Baseball draft.

The minors 
That first summer of 2010 in the Cardinals organization he played for the Batavia Muckdogs of the New York–Penn League, finishing the season with a 1.54 ERA and a perfect 6-0 win/loss record. In 2011, Gast split time between the Palm Beach Cardinals and the Double-AA affiliate Springfield Cardinals, posting a combined record of nine wins and eight losses. He started the 2012 season with the Springfield Cardinals again but in mid-May was moved up to Triple-A baseball with the Memphis Redbirds, finishing the year with a 13-7 record.

Major League career 
Gast began the 2013 season with the Memphis Redbirds, where he pitched thirty-two consecutive scoreless innings. He was named Pacific Coast League pitcher of the week for the week ending April 21. Gast was called up on May 12, 2013, after Jake Westbrook was put on the 15-day disabled list. He made his major league debut on May 14, 2013 at Busch Stadium against the New York Mets. Gast threw five shutout innings but gave up four runs in the sixth inning. He gave up six hits total, walked one, and struck out three to earn his first victory as a Cardinal. Gast won in his second start with the Cardinals as well, giving up two runs on four hits and two walks over 5 innings as St. Louis beat the Milwaukee Brewers 4-2.
He was placed on the disabled list on May 26, after suffering a shoulder strain. On July 26, 2013 Gast underwent season-ending surgery on his left shoulder. According to the Cardinals John Mozeliak that the expected recovery and rehabilitation time is between eight and twelve months. It is the second major surgery for Gast, his first being Tommy John surgery while he was a high school senior.

Gast was outrighted off the Cardinals roster on November 20, 2013.

After many complications and injuries, Gast retired from baseball in January 2016.

Personal 
John Gast is the son of David and Sharon Gast, and has been an avid baseball fan since age six. His family was present at Busch Stadium when he made his major league debut for the Cardinals. While at Florida State Gast majored in Marketing. He excelled academically as well as athletically, being named to the ACC Honor Roll and earning Deans List honors.

References

External links

1989 births
Living people
People from Altamonte Springs, Florida
Baseball players from Florida
Baseball pitchers
St. Louis Cardinals players
Batavia Muckdogs players
Lake Brantley High School alumni
Palm Beach Cardinals players
Springfield Cardinals players
Harwich Mariners players
Memphis Redbirds players
Florida State Seminoles baseball players
Sportspeople from Seminole County, Florida